Ryan Jones (born 23 July 1973) is a former professional footballer who played as a midfielder.

Club career
Jones notably played in the Premier League for Sheffield Wednesday, as well as a loan spell with Scunthorpe United. He finished his career with non-league side Worksop Town, where he retired through injury.

International career
Born in England, he was capped by Wales on one occasion, in a match against Estonia in 1994.

References

Since 1888... The Searchable Premiership and Football League Player Database (subscription required)

1973 births
Living people
Welsh footballers
Footballers from Sheffield
Wales international footballers
Association football midfielders
Premier League players
Sheffield Wednesday F.C. players
Scunthorpe United F.C. players
Worksop Town F.C. players
English footballers
English people of Welsh descent